Borja Oubiña Meléndez (born 17 May 1982) is a Spanish retired footballer who played as a defensive midfielder.

After starting his professional career at local Celta, he played in England with Birmingham City in 2007, but his spell was immediately cut short with a severe knee injury, which would relapse in the following years. He appeared in 236 competitive matches for his main club, with whom he spent five La Liga seasons.

Club career

A ball-winning midfielder who came through the youth teams of hometown club RC Celta de Vigo, Oubiña was born in Vigo, and he first appeared with the first team – courtesy of Miguel Ángel Lotina – during 2003–04 in a 2–2 away draw against Valencia CF, as the Galicians, then also participating in the UEFA Champions League, eventually finished second from bottom in La Liga; he became a mainstay in the subsequent seasons, under Fernando Vázquez.

After Celta's top-flight relegation in the 2006–07 campaign, Oubiña stated his desire to leave although still under contract. As of August, it seemed that countryman José Antonio Camacho's S.L. Benfica were in the pole to acquire his services, but an agreement could not be reached on a fee – rumoured to be €10 million.

On 31 August 2007, a one-year loan to Premier League side Birmingham City was agreed. Oubiña made his competitive debut on 15 September, as a late substitute against Bolton Wanderers; after 13 minutes of the next match, at Liverpool, he sustained an injury in a collision with Dirk Kuyt to his left anterior cruciate ligament, and was expected to be sidelined for at least six months.

On 9 February 2008, Oubiña's loan spell at Birmingham was cancelled by mutual consent, and he returned to Vigo to start his recovery. On 6 December, more than a year after his last appearance, he played four minutes in a 2–0 loss at UD Las Palmas, and made a further 14 appearances in the season; he relapsed in mid-September 2009, and underwent surgery in October preparatory to the planned reconstruction of his cruciate ligament in early 2010, after which he would miss the remainder of 2009–10.

Oubiña returned to full fitness in the 2011–12 campaign, playing 28 matches (24 starts, 2,120 minutes of action) as Celta returned to the top tier after a five-year absence. In 2014–15, however, he again failed to appear in any games due to injury. 

On 22 May 2015, five days after his 33rd birthday, Oubiña announced his retirement.

International career
Oubiña earned two caps for the Spain national team, the first coming on 2 September 2006 against Liechtenstein in Badajoz (4–0 victory): he came on as a substitute for David Albelda in the second half of a UEFA Euro 2008 qualifier.

Career statistics

References

External links

1982 births
Living people
Spanish footballers
Footballers from Vigo
Association football midfielders
La Liga players
Segunda División players
Segunda División B players
Celta de Vigo B players
RC Celta de Vigo players
Premier League players
Birmingham City F.C. players
Spain international footballers
Spanish expatriate footballers
Expatriate footballers in England
Spanish expatriate sportspeople in England